The 1890–91 Ottawa Hockey Club season was the club's sixth season of play. The club would have an outstanding record, winning 13 and losing 1. The club would play in the Ontario Hockey Association (OHA) in the OHA's first season and would win its championship, the Cosby Cup, against Amateur Hockey Association of Canada(AHAC) teams and against other Ottawa teams.

Team business
The club met on November 19, 1890, and elected their officers:
 F. M. S. Jenkins, president
 P. D. Ross, captain
 D. C. Scott, secretary-treasurer

The club also approved the idea of the forming of a city league in Ottawa composed of the Ottawa HC, Rideau Club, Ottawa College, Dey's Rink and Rebels clubs. This was the start of the Ottawa City Hockey League.

The club nominated J. A. Baum to be their representative at the founding meeting of the Ontario Hockey Association. Frank Jenkins, it was announced, would not play this year due to "an accident to his leg."

In the team's financial statement for the season, the team recorded a $70.11 deficit on expenses of $121.11 and minus an OAAC grant of $30 and $21 from team member subscriptions.

Schedule and results

1 City championship
2 AHAC challenge
3 OHA championship

Sources:

Roster
 Albert Morel – goal
 Reginald Bradley
 F. M. S. Jenkins – point,
 Jack Kerr – point,
 Weldy Young – cover-point,
 P. D. Ross – forward,
 Halder Kirby – forward,
 Chauncey Kirby – forward,
 Bert Russel – forward,
 J. Smith – forward

References
 

Ottawa Senators (original) seasons
Ottawa